The National Bank Cup was the pre-eminent national netball competition in New Zealand between 1998 and 2007. From 2008, it was replaced by the ANZ Championship.

Format
In the rounds, each team played every other team once, then the top four teams played off for the cup using the Page–McIntyre system.

Teams

Defunct teams
 Counties Manukau Cometz (1998–2003)
 Waikato Wildcats (1998)
 Bay of Plenty Magic (1998)

Winners

† Waikato/BOP Magic was given the home final, but the game had to be played in Invercargill due to the Mystery Creek Events Centre being used for the National Agricultural Fieldays.

Early years: Coca-Cola Cup

Franchise Setup

Originally called the Coca-Cola Cup from 1998, the competition promised to enhance netball's profile in New Zealand. Nine franchises were announced by Netball New Zealand in late 1997. The new teams included the Southern Sting – a side based in Invercargill that included star Silver Ferns Donna Loffhagen and Bernice Mene. Otago's Rebels fielded an impressive line-up that included former, current and future Silver Ferns Jo Morrison, Belinda Colling, Adine Harper, Anna Rowberry and Belinda Charteris. Further north in Auckland, their city was represented by three teams. The CMTV Cometz featured the best from South Auckland, the Diamonds represented Central Auckland and the highly fancied Northern Force were based from the North Shore. In Christchurch, the city welcomed to the sporting scene the Canterbury Flames. A province with proud netball links, the Flames were made up of the talented netballers in the Canterbury region.

1998-2001

The 1998 season started with the Otago Rebels named outright favourites to take the inaugural season. With six current, former or future Silver Ferns in their ranks, they came through season 1998 undefeated. The Invercargill-based Southern Sting were the surprise package during 1998. With two Silver Ferns at each end of the court, the Sting surprised all making their way to the grand final in Dunedin, going down to the Rebels 57-50. The Auckland Diamonds, along with the Canterbury Flames reached the top four. Flames were eliminated from the semi's in a game from Invercargill where they went down by a single goal. The Waikato Wildcats and Bay of Plenty Magic suffered large losses throughout the season and joined forces in 1999 to create the Waikato/BOP Magic.
 
The 1999 season promised to be just as exciting as the Coca-Cola Cup's inaugural season. Like in 1998, the two southern sides Sting and Rebels came into the competition as the strongest. The Rebels retained their talented line-up of Silver Ferns, while Sting added to their roster, picking up English international Naomi Siddall as the teams import. The Auckland Diamonds also came into the season as a threat, along with their northern rivals the Force. 
After nine rounds of the competition, the semi-finals began. The Sting fought off the Northern Force in Invercargill 61-44, while the Rebels were also victorious. The Sting and Rebels met in the final for the second year in a row, but this time it was the Sting who celebrated by taking the title 63-54.

After the Rebels taking the 1998 title, and the Sting 1999, the competitions North Island teams fought hard in season 2000. The Auckland Diamonds recruited smartly. Jamaican star Elaine Davis was picked up as their marquee signing. The Northern Force fielded as strong side also that included Tania Dalton, Temepara George and Linda Vangana. The two Auckland sides though, the Diamonds and Force failed to take the title, Diamonds finishing 6th and the Force reaching the semi-finals stage. In Wellington, the Capital Shakers landed South African Irene van Dyk. The 1.90m shooter helped the franchise on attack, but was unable to steer the team to the title. In the end, after three months of competition, the Sting took the title once again. After signing Lesley Nicol from the Rebels and retaining Silver Ferns Donna Loffhagen and Bernice Mene, the Sting were unstoppable. Winning back to back in front of their home fans in Invercargill, they defeated the Canterbury Flames 43-40 in the final, in front of a capacity crowd of 4300.

Season 2001 had the Sting aiming for three years in a row. The Invercargill-based franchise recruited well, retaining its stars and adding another to the roster, in Adine Harper. The Canterbury Flames plotted a plan to take the cup as well. Finalists in 2000, the Flames welcomed Leigh Gibbs to the coaching bench and assembled a strong team that included Silver Ferns Angela Mitchell, Belinda Colling, Julie Seymour, Belinda Charteris and Vili Davu. The Capital Shakers made their second semi-finals appearance, but again like in season 2000, were unable to progress, beaten by eventual champions the Southern Sting. The Sting made it three from four seasons defeating the Flames again for the second consecutive year in the final from Invercargill.

Revamp: National Bank Cup 

2002-2004

The Southern Sting continued their dominance of the National Bank Cup, and would go on to win the competition again in 2002, 03 and 04. The Sting retained their core group of Donna Loffhagen, Lesley Rumball and Adine Harper, but lost the services of inspirational captain Bernice Mene – who retired after the 2002 season. The Invercargill-based franchise wasted no time to replace her, bringing in former Silver Fern and Canterbury Flames defender Anna Galvan. The Sting's defeat over the Flames in the 2004 final 63-55 would be their last title for some time.

The Flames would again fail to take the title, making the finals again in both 2002 and 2004. The Christchurch team showed promise on attack with the Silver Fern shooting pair of Jodi Te Huna and Belinda Colling impressive throughout the 2003 and 2004 seasons. Vili Davu and captain Julie Seymour were the glue through the defence end and midcourt respectively.

The Wellington Shakers made the finals in 2002, but struggled from 2003 – due to the departure of star Silver Fern Irene van Dyk. van Dyk shocked officials in Wellington with the announcement that she would join the Waikato/BOP Magic. The Shakers never found their way back to the semi finals, struggling on attack and fielding a mostly inexperienced line-up.

In Auckland, the Northern Force made their first National Bank Cup final in 2003. With Daneka Wipiiti, Teresa Tairi, Temepara George, Sheryl Scanlan and Linda Vangana on board, the Force fielded the strongest line-up on paper. But they would fail to defeat the Sting at home in the 2003 final, going down by two goals, 51-49. The Force would make the semi final again in 2004, but were beaten by the Flames on the North Shore. 
The Force's rivals the Auckland Diamonds feared no better. 5th place getters in 2004, the Diamonds missed out on the chance to become the North Islands first winner. Anna Rowberry was impressive from the midcourt, but the team struggled to win when it counted – including a crucial loss to the Flames in regular play that confirmed their fate.

The Waikato/BOP Magic were ecstatic with the off season signing of Irene van Dyk for 2003, and the team's fortunes turned from there. Semi finalists in 2003 and 2004, although failing to go all the way, Magic showed promise for the future. Van Dyk worked well in combination with GA Anna Senio and midcourters Laura Langman and Amigene Metcalfe.

2005-2006

Champions changed for the 2005 and 2006 seasons with the Waikato/BOP Magic shocking all by defeating the Southern Sting, to take the title. The Magic, led by Silver Ferns Irene van Dyk, Laura Langman, Joline Henry and Casey Williams made history by becoming the first North Island team to win in 2005, with a 65-39 smashing over the former champions Southern Sting. They backed things up in 2006 by re-gaining the title at home in Hamilton with another large victory.

The Canterbury Flames drifted down the pecking order in the final three seasons, struggling to make the finals – the Flames finishing a poor 5th in 2005. The Christchurch-based side was over taken by the Auckland Diamonds  – as one of the 'big four teams', after the signings of several top class players. The Diamonds signed Silver Ferns shooter Jodi Brown in 2005, along with former English international Jo Morrison, to complement their four other international players.

The Northern Force failed to perform with their talented roster, while the Capital Shakers and Western Flyers continued to struggle as the competitions cellar dwellers.

2007

2007 was dubbed the final season of The National Bank Cup. The Southern Sting were fitting winners of the competition for the final time, defeating the Northern Force in the grand final from Auckland, 50-49. Sting coach Robyn Broughton featured in her 100th game, as the Sting ran winners. The franchise had secured the services of Silver Fern squad members Daneka Wipiiti and Liana Barrett-Chase in the off season, after the loss of Tania Dalton to retirement. The duo join Southern Sting veterans Donna Wilkins, Adine Wilson, Megan Hutton and Jenny Ferguson.

The Otago Rebels looked to make an improvement for 2007. They picked up the signature of Silver Fern Jodi Brown from the Auckland Diamonds, while added Australian Demelza McCloud to their backline. The Rebels though, finished a disappointing 6th. Their northern rivals Canterbury Flames feared no better, finishing 5th.

In the North Island, the defending champions Waikato/BOP Magic made the semi final stage, but were defeated by two goals by the Sting in Invercargill. While the Northern Force hosted the grand final for the first time. Boasting a line-up full of Silver Ferns, they could not make it a tenth time lucky – going down to the Sting, 50-49.

The Sting celebrated a week later in Invercargill with a ticker tape parade, where mayor Tim Shadbolt congratulated the team on their success throughout the ten-year competition.

The eight franchises later amalgamated into five ANZ Championship teams for the 2008 trans-Tasman season. The Southern Sting and Otago Rebels joined forces to create the Southern Steel, while the Canterbury Flames re-branded as the Tactix. In Wellington, the Capital Shakers and the Flyers formed the Central Pulse, the Magic remained the status quo, while the Auckland Diamonds and Force welcomed the Mystics.

References

External links
The National Bank netball website
Netball New Zealand NBC page

 
Defunct netball leagues in New Zealand
Sports leagues established in 1998
1998 establishments in New Zealand
1998 disestablishments in New Zealand